Sudha Yadav is a Indian politician who was former member of the lower house of India's parliament Lok Sabha and the current National Secretary of Bharatiya Janata Party. She was a member of the 13th Lok Sabha from 1999 to 2004, elected from Mahendragarh in Haryana as a candidate of Bharatiya Janata Party. Recently, She has been inducted in BJP Parliamentary Board (https://www.bjp.org/parliamentary-board) as well as in Central Election Committee. Her husband, Deputy Commandant Sukhbir Singh Yadav,  of Border Security Force, died fighting Pakistani intruders at border in Kargil war. A lecturer by profession, she is mother of two children. She was a member of JPC set up to probe soft drinks issue. Presently she is national secretary of BJP. Dr. Sudha Yadav lost the 2004 election from Mahendragarh Lok Sabha constituency and the 2009 election from Gurgaon Lok Sabha constituency as a candidate of the Bhartiya Janta Party. On 3 July 2015, Sudha Yadav was appointed the in-charge of BJP OBC Morcha.

1999 Lok Sabha Elections
This was the most traumatic as well as strange year in her life. She lost her husband in Indo-Pakistan Kargil conflict. Therefore she got a job as lecturer under preferential quota for war widows. Bhartiya Janta Party made her a candidate from Mahendragarh constituency for the election to Lok Sabha in 1999. This was the first election she ever fought. It successfully transformed her from a simple housewife to a successful politician who defeated a well-known veteran lifelong politician. However she could not win the elections in 2004 and 2009.
She graduated in 1987 from University of Roorkee (now IIT Roorkee).

References

External links
  Campaign Site for 2009 Lok Sabha elections 

Living people
1965 births
Bharatiya Janata Party politicians from Haryana
Members of the Haryana Legislative Assembly
20th-century Indian women politicians
20th-century Indian politicians
India MPs 1999–2004
Lok Sabha members from Haryana
21st-century Indian women politicians
Women members of the Haryana Legislative Assembly